Henry Kable (1763–16 March 1846), born in Laxfield, Suffolk, England, was an Englishman transported to Australia in the First Fleet and became a prominent business man.

Conviction and transport to Australia

On 18 March 1783, Kable was convicted of burglary at Thetford, Norfolk, England and sentenced to death. His sentence was commuted to transportation for fourteen years to the United States, however, the American Revolution made transportation to America impossible and Henry was returned to the Norwich Castle jail.

At Norwich Castle gaol, Henry met and began a relationship with Susannah Holmes, who gave birth in prison to a son Henry.  Holmes had been sentenced to death on 22 March 1784 after being found guilty of theft. Her sentence was also commuted and she was sentenced to transportation to the United States colonies for a term of 14 years.

When Susannah was chosen to be transported to Botany Bay on the First Fleet, the ship's captain refused to accept the child on board as the order was only for Susannah. Moved by their plight several people became involved, ensuring Henry and the baby were included in the First Fleet, and money and good were raised for them.

Mrs. Jackson, a well-known actress from Covent Garden, organised a public subscription which yielded a substantial sum to buy Henry and Susannah a parcel of goods on their arrival in the new colony. Lady Cadigan wife of Lord Cadigan, rewarded the turnkey after the event for his kindness in the Kable case.

Henry and Susannah were transported on the ship the Friendship, sailing in the First Fleet to New South Wales.

The parcel of goods put together by Mrs Jackson in a hessian parcel was stowed on the ship Alexander for the journey.  The gift, however, was plundered on the voyage.  In the first civil suit heard in New South Wales, Henry and Susannah Kable won damages of £15 against the captain (Duncan Sinclair) of the Alexander, this despite the rule that prisoners who had been sentenced to death were unable to sue in English law.

Life in Australia

On 10 February 1788, Henry and Susannah Kable married in Sydney in a group wedding (the first European wedding ceremony in the new colony).

Soon after his arrival, Governor Phillip appointed Kable an overseer. The oddity of being the plaintiff in the first civil suit won by a convict may have brought Kable to the governor's notice, however, Kable later claimed to have had influential letters of recommendation.

In 1798, Kable opened a hotel called the Ramping Horse, from which he ran the first stage coach in Australia, and he also owned a retail store.

Henry became a constable of police, and later chief constable in the new colony and was involved on the prosecution side in criminal cases. Kable was dismissed 25 May 1802 for misbehaviour, after being convicted for breaches of the port regulations and illegally buying and importing pigs from a visiting ship. After this, he became merchant and ship owner. Like others in the colony, and perhaps because of his early success, Henry used the courts to argue cases against his opponents. He seems to have prospered; in 1808 shipping records show Kable and two partners, boat builder James Underwood and the other Simeon Lord, as principal ship owners in the expanding commerce of acquiring and exporting sealskins to the colony. Kable was one of 70 signatories to a petition to Governor Hunter from creditors who were anxious to prevent debtors from frustrating their demands by legal delays. The partnership dissolved in some bitterness shortly afterwards but not before Henry had managed to divest himself of a good deal of his property to his son, in order to avoid the consequences of any court order. Kable did much to pioneer sealing and shipbuilding in New South Wales, working with Simeon Lord who marketed the skins and James Underwood who built the ships.

Like Lord and other early Sydney entrepreneurs, Kable always had a substantial landholding as a kind of 'sheet anchor'. He had been granted farms at Petersham Hill in 1794 and 1795, and in the latter year bought out four near-by grantees within a week of their grants being signed. In 1807 he owned at least four farms of about 170 acres (69 ha); in 1809 in addition he held five farms at the Hawkesbury and 300 acres (121 ha) at the Cowpastures, with a variety of real estate in Sydney itself including his comfortable house and extensive stores. He also had 40 horned cattle, 9 horses and 40 pigs. His business reputation seems to have been dubious, for he was regarded with distrust by Governor King and with active hostility by Governor Bligh who thought him and his partners fraudulent and had them imprisoned for a month and fined each £100 for sending him a letter couched in improper terms. It is certain that Kable played no part in public life comparable with Simeon Lord's multifarious activities. His commercial career in Sydney seems to have ended soon after Lord & Co. broke up, for as early as February 1810 he announced that his son Henry Junior had taken over the entire management of his Sydney affairs. In 1811 Kable moved to Windsor where he operated a store and brewery, the latter in association with a partner, Richard Woodbury and his Sydney warehouse was let to Michael Hayes.

Kable died on 16 April 1846, at Pitt Town near Windsor, New South Wales and was buried on 18 April 1846, at St Matthew's Anglican Church, Windsor.

Legacy

Henry and Susannah Kable had 11 children in total.  Henry who had been born in England and another 10 children born in New South Wales including Dianna (1788–1854), Enoch (1791–1793), James (1793-1809), Susannah (1796-1885), George Esto (1797-1853), Eunice (1799-1867), William Nathaniel (1801-1837) John (1802-1859), Charles Dickenson (born 1804), and Edgar James (1806–1849).

In 1968, on the 180th anniversary of the arrival of the First Fleet, more than a hundred descendants of Henry and Susannah Kable met in Sydney at Crows Nest to honour them as one of Australia's founding families. It was the first reunion of descendants in Australia to acknowledge convict ancestry.

The 1977 folk opera The Transports by Peter Bellamy is based on the story of Henry Kable and his wife Susannah.

In 1984, Zillah Kable Thomas and Lola Wilkinson, descendants of Henry and Susannah, unveiled a plaque commemorating Henry's land grant on the site of the former Regent Hotel (and the current Four Seasons Hotel) and the opening of the Kable's restaurant.

In 1988, a family reunion saw 500 of Kable's descendants meet to celebrate Henry and Susannah's 200th Wedding Anniversary and the Bicentenary of Australia on the site of the first gaol in Sydney and the one that Henry controlled as the first chief constable in the colony.  The event was recognised as an official Bicentennial event by the Australian Bicentennial Authority.

In 2018 another family reunion was celebrated.

Celebrity veterinarian Katrina Warren is a descendant of Henry and Susannah Kable through their son John.

References

Bibliography

External links
Henry and Susannah Kable
Kable/Holmes First Fleeter 1788
Henry Kable and Susannah Holmes website 2018

Convicts transported to Australia on the First Fleet
1763 births
1846 deaths
People from Mid Suffolk District
Australian people in whaling
Australian ship owners
Sealers
19th-century Australian businesspeople